Ramón David Santiago Sanchez (born August 31, 1979) is a Dominican-American former professional baseball player, and minor league coach for the Detroit Tigers. Santiago played in Major League Baseball (MLB) as an infielder for the Detroit Tigers from 2002 to 2003, the Seattle Mariners from 2004 to 2005, again with the Tigers from 2006–2013 and with the Cincinnati Reds in 2014. He spent most of his major league career at shortstop, but also played a significant amount of time at second base, and occasionally third base. He is the only MLB player in history to hit a grand slam in his last at bat with a walk off home run. He accomplished this feat playing with the Cincinnati Reds with two outs in the bottom of the 10th inning on September 27, 2014 on a 1-0 pitch from the Pittsburgh Pirates' Bobby LaFromboise.

Career

Detroit Tigers
Santiago made his major league debut for the Tigers in 2002. Used mainly as a backup, he was still named to the 2002 Topps All-Star Rookie Roster. During his rookie season, Santiago hit first-inning lead-off home runs on consecutive days (June 3, 2002 and June 4, 2002). In the June 3 game, he hit a second home run in the seventh inning. In 2003, Santiago assumed the starting shortstop role for the Tigers.

Seattle Mariners
Santiago struggled and was traded, along with minor league player Juan Gonzalez, to Seattle in exchange for Carlos Guillén.

During Santiago's two seasons with the Mariners, he played in only 27 games, spending most of his time in the minor leagues for the Triple-A Tacoma Rainiers. While playing for the Rainiers, Santiago was selected as the team's MVP and Best Glove in 2005. He was also selected as the 2005 Top Second Baseman for the Triple-A Pacific Coast League. However, Santiago was released following the 2005 season.

Second stint with the Detroit Tigers
The Mariners organization released Santiago after the 2005 season, and he was re-signed by the Tigers as a free agent for 2006.

Santiago played in 43 regular-season games and started in 18 games for the American League Champion Tigers in 2006. He played shortstop, second base and third base and did not make an error in 205 innings of play. Santiago started at shortstop in Game 1 and Game 2 of the 2006 World Series.

Santiago played for the Cibao Gigantes in the Dominican Winter League in 2009 and 2010.  He led the team to a second-place finish in the Dominican Winter League Championships in 2010 and was asked to play shortstop for the Escogido Leones on  Team Dominicana in the 2010 Caribbean World Series, which the Dominican won as Santiago hit .316 at the plate.

During the Tigers run to the 2011 American League Central Division championship, Santiago played in 101 games, mostly at second base, and hit .260.  His season highlights included a walk-off home run on August 30, which gave the Tigers a 2–1 victory over the Kansas City Royals in the bottom of the 10th inning. He also drove in the winning run with a walk-off triple in a June 13 game against the Tampa Bay Rays.

On November 30, 2011, the Tigers re-signed Santiago to a two-year extension, which kept him on the team through the 2013 season.

With the return of Omar Infante in July 2012, Santiago lost his every day second base position. He still played some games as a pinch hitter and as a late-inning defensive replacement. He also started at second and shortstop when needed. In a July 2013 game versus the Toronto Blue Jays, Colby Rasmus slid into second base, slide-tackling Infante, who was injured and placed on the disabled list. Santiago was called into the game and finished it out, and played several more games at second base until Infante returned.

Cincinnati Reds
Santiago was a non-roster invitee to the 2014 Cincinnati Reds training camp, and he made the team as a reserve infielder. On September 27, he hit a walk–off grand slam in the 13th inning against Pittsburgh Pirates pitcher Bobby LaFromboise in what would be the last at–bat of Santiago's Major League career. He elected free agency on October 30, 2014.

Toronto Blue Jays
Santiago signed a minor league deal with the Toronto Blue Jays on January 30, 2015. During a spring training game against the Atlanta Braves on March 15, Santiago broke his left collarbone. He was released on March 30. The Blue Jays re-signed him to a minor league contract on April 6. He started the season on the disabled list of the Triple-A Buffalo Bisons, and was released on July 24.

Post-playing career
Santiago rejoined the Detroit Tigers organization as a coach and served as the first base coach for the 2018 and 2019 seasons. He shifted to third base coach prior to the 2020 season. Following the hiring of new Tigers manager A. J. Hinch and third base coach Chip Hale for the 2021 season, the team announced Santiago would return to coaching first base. In 2022, he returned to coaching at third base.

References

External links

1979 births
Living people
Cincinnati Reds players
Detroit Tigers coaches
Detroit Tigers players
Dominican Republic baseball coaches
Dominican Republic expatriate baseball players in the United States
Dominican Republic national baseball team people
Erie SeaWolves players
Gigantes del Cibao players
Gulf Coast Tigers players
Lakeland Tigers players
Leones del Escogido players
Major League Baseball first base coaches
Major League Baseball players from the Dominican Republic
Major League Baseball second basemen
Major League Baseball shortstops
Major League Baseball third base coaches
Oneonta Tigers players
Seattle Mariners players
Tacoma Rainiers players
Toledo Mud Hens players
West Michigan Whitecaps players
Naturalized citizens of the United States